The Constitution Alteration (Legislative Powers) Bill 1919, was an unsuccessful proposal to alter the Australian Constitution to temporarily extend Commonwealth legislative powers with respect to trade and commerce, corporations, industrial matters and trusts that was put to voters for approval in a referendum held in 1919. If approved, the  amendments would have operated for a maximum of 3 years. The 1919 referendum was held in conjunction with the 1919 federal election.

Question
Do you approve of the proposed law for the alteration of the Constitution entitled 'Constitution Alteration (Legislative Powers) 1919'?

Results
Question: Do you approve of the proposed law for the alteration of the Constitution entitled 'Constitution Alteration (Legislative Powers) 1919'?

References

1919 referendums
Referendum (Legislative Powers)

Constitutional referendums in Australia